Julie Stevens (born Julia Bullas; born 20 December 1936) is an English actress, presenter and singer, best known in Britain for her appearances on children's television.

Career
Stevens was born in Prestwich and attended Stand Grammar School. She trained as a nurse at Manchester Royal Infirmary, after starting her television career as a comedienne in TV show Bid for Fame. She was a regular on Play School and Play Away, and provided vocals for the schools television series Look and Read.

During the 1962–63 season she played Venus Smith, an occasional partner of John Steed in the TV series, The Avengers, alternating with Honor Blackman's Cathy Gale. Venus was a nightclub singer, and each of her appearances included at least one musical number. She appeared in only six episodes, and Stevens is not usually included in the list of "Avengers girls".

In 1964, Stevens appeared in the British comedy film Carry On Cleo playing the slave girl Gloria. She also co-starred with Denise Coffey in the 1969–71 ITV comedy series Girls About Town, and appeared in the children's historical comedy series Cabbages and Kings (1972) opposite Johnny Ball and Derek Griffiths.

Personal life 
She married actor John White in January 1962; they had two children, but separated in 1975. Stevens was later married to the actor and director Michael Hucks from 1981 until 2001. White, who was also a presenter on Play School during the late 1960s, died from bone cancer in 1993.

Discography
Songs from Play School, with Rick Jones and Jonathan Cohen (1969)

References

External links 

1936 births
English television actresses
English television presenters
Living people
People from Prestwich
BBC television presenters
People educated at Stand Grammar School